My Days of Mercy is a 2017 romantic drama film directed by Tali Shalom Ezer and written by Joe Barton. It stars Kate Mara, Elliot Page, Amy Seimetz, Brian Geraghty, and Elias Koteas.

It screened at the 2017 Toronto International Film Festival on September 8, 2017, as a Gala Presentation. It was released in the United Kingdom on May 17, 2019, by Signature Entertainment, and was released in the United States on July 5, 2019, by Lionsgate.

Plot

Lucy Moro and her older sister Martha are anti-death penalty protestors, fighting for the acquittal of their father Simon, who is on death row for the murder of their mother eight years ago. The sisters live in their parents' house in a small Ohio town, and travel to various states in a mobile home, together with their little 10-year-old brother Ben. At one demonstration outside a prison in Illinois, Lucy meets Mercy Bromage, a lawyer whose father is a police officer with ties to the death penalty case the crowd is protesting. Despite the political tensions between the two, Lucy and Mercy grow closer to each other. They begin to keep in contact over the phone and over Skype. During a solo excursion to a demonstration in Missouri, Lucy and Mercy start a romance.

Meanwhile, Martha is determined to free their father (who she still believes is innocent) and manages to hire a lawyer, who is then able to get a four-month stay of execution to look for legal loopholes or any new evidence to re-open the case. When the last of Martha and Lucy's legal appeals is denied and the evidence continues to point towards Simon, a distraught Lucy travels alone to Illinois to visit Mercy. There, she learns that Mercy still lives with her parents and she also has a boyfriend. Feeling used and betrayed, Lucy breaks up with Mercy. Regardless, Mercy attends Simon's execution with the sisters.

Six months later, Lucy is working as a waitress in California when Mercy shows up outside the window. The two women talk in the alley and Mercy attempts to rekindle their relationship, but Lucy rejects her, saying "I just don't think you can come back into someone's life like this". However, the two set up a date for later.

Cast
 Elliot Page as Lucy Moro
 Kate Mara as Mercy Bromage
 Amy Seimetz as Martha Moro
 Charlie Shotwell as Ben Moro
 Brian Geraghty as Weldon
 Elias Koteas as Simon Moro
 Beau Knapp as Toby
 Tonya Pinkins as Agatha
 Jake Robinson as Ian
 Jordan Trovillion as Katlin

Production
In August 2016, Elliot Page, Kate Mara, Pablo Schreiber, Elias Koteas and Amy Seimetz were cast in the film, with Tali Shalom Ezer directing from a screenplay by Joe Barton. Christine Vachon and David Hinojosa served as producers under their Killer Films banner, alongside Mara and Page, while Robert Halmi Jr. and Jim Reeve will serve as executive producers through their Great Point Media banner along with executive producer Karri O'Reilly. In September 2016, Brian Geraghty joined the cast of the film, replacing Schreiber.

Principal photography began on September 19, 2016.

Release
The film had its world premiere at the Toronto International Film Festival on September 9, 2017. It was released in the United Kingdom on May 17, 2019, by Signature Entertainment, and was released in the United States on July 5, 2019, by Lionsgate.

Reception
On review aggregator website Rotten Tomatoes, the film has an approval rating of 89% based on 19 reviews, and an average rating of 7/10. The website's critical consensus reads, "Though My Days of Mercy knotty romance drifts into melodrama, it's grounded by Ellen Page and Kate Mara's exceptional chemistry."

The film was selected to compete for the Premio Maguey's Best Film award at the 33rd Guadalajara International Film Festival, where Page was awarded in the Best Performance category.

Notes

References

External links
 
 

2017 films
2017 independent films
2017 LGBT-related films
2017 romantic drama films
American independent films
American LGBT-related films
American romantic drama films
British independent films
British LGBT-related films
British romantic drama films
Films produced by Christine Vachon
Films produced by Elliot Page
Killer Films films
Lesbian-related films
LGBT-related romantic drama films
2010s English-language films
2010s American films
2010s British films